The Catholic Bishops' Conference of Japan (Japanese: カトリック中央協議会, Hepburn: Katorikku Chūo Hyōgikai), also abbreviated as the CBCJ,  is the Catholic episcopal conference of Japan, representing predominantly the members of the Latin Japanese Catholic Church. It was founded as the Nippon Tenshu Kokyo Kyodan (The Japanese Catholic Religious Body). After the implementation and execution of the Religious Corporations Act, the body was renamed the CBCJ, becoming a religious corporation as classified under Japanese law.

As specified in Canons 447 - 459 of the Code of Canon Law, the main purpose of the organisation is to deliberate on matters concerning the Japanese Catholic Church and to encourage active practice of the Catholic faith and ministries.

The head office of the corporation is located in Kōtō, Tokyo.

Organisation

Membership 
The Catholic Bishops' Conference of Japan is composed of multiple types of bishops: the diocesan bishops as well as their auxiliary and coadjutor bishops. It also includes of honorary bishops appointed by the Holy See or the organisation for specific tasks.

 President of the Conference
 Vice President
 Members (Diocesan bishops, auxiliary bishops, coadjutor bishops, honorary bishops)
 Bishop in Charge

The Conference is further divided into various groups, each with their functions and level of seniority within the organisation. They consist of the Standing Committee, Plenary Assemblies, Special Committees, and Sections directly under the Standing Committees.

Governance 
The Standing Committee is the central executive organ of the corporation, which represents the Conference when the Plenary Assembly is not in session. the Committee consists of several individuals:

 President and Vice President of the Conference
 5 additional members selected in a session of the Plenary Assembly.

The duties of the Committee include the administration of the Conference, the agenda preparation for the Plenary Assemblies, the annual budget, the presentation of the statement of accounts, directions of the General Secretariat, etc.

The current chair of the Standing Committee is Tarcisio Isao Kikuchi, Archbishop of Tokyo.

Episcopal Commission for Social Issues

Committees 
The role of the Episcopal Commission for Social Issues is to contribute to evangelisation of the Catholic faith and actively participate in solving current social issues in Japan and its Catholic Church. Members of the Commission include:

 Chair, Japan Catholic Council for Social Justice and Peace
 President and Vice President, Caritas Japan
 Chair, Committee against BURAKU Discrimination through Human-Rights Approaches,
 Chair, Catholic Commission of Japan for Migrants, Refugees and People on the Move
 President of the HIV/AIDS Desk
 the bishop in charge of the Protection of the Human Rights of Women and Children Desk

The current chair of the Commission is Taiji Katsuya.

Committees directly affiliated with the Standing Committee

Committees affiliated with the Episcopal Commission for Social Issues 

 Committees Affiliated with the Episcopal Commission for Social Issues
 Catholic Commission of Japan for Migrants, Refugees and People on the Move
 Caritas Japan
 Japan Catholic Council for Justice and Peace
 Committee against BURAKU Discrimination through Human-Rights Approaches
 Protection of the Human Rights of Women and Children Desk
 HIV/AIDS Desk

See also
 Catholic Church in Japan
 Christianity in Japan

References

External links
 

Japan
Catholic Church in Japan